Josef Štraub (born March 5, 1966) is a Czech former professional ice hockey forward.

Štraub played in the Czechoslovak First Ice Hockey League and the Czech Extraliga for HC Dukla Jihlava, HC Zlín, HC Oceláři Třinec, HC Vítkovice, HC Slavia Praha, Motor České Budějovice and VHK Vsetín. In his 17 seasons in the top tier of Czech ice hockey, Štraub never won a league championship, winning a silver medal in 1995 and 1999 with Zlín and a bronze medal in 2001 with Vítkovice. He did however win a league championship in the second-tier 1st Czech Republic Hockey League in 2005 with České Budějovice.

References

External links

1966 births
Living people
Czech ice hockey coaches
Czech ice hockey forwards
Motor České Budějovice players
HC Dukla Jihlava players
LHK Jestřábi Prostějov players
HC Oceláři Třinec players
HC ZUBR Přerov players
HC Slavia Praha players
HC Tábor players
HC Vítkovice players
VHK Vsetín players
PSG Berani Zlín players
Czechoslovak ice hockey forwards